Luke Davison (born 8 May 1990) is an Australian road and track cyclist who rides for Team Budget Forklifts. In 2012 he won the Goulburn to Sydney Classic.  In 2014 he represented Australia at the Track World Championships and the Commonwealth Games and won gold in the team pursuit event at both meetings. On the road he won the Omloop der Kempen. In November 2014 it was announced that he would rejoin Team Budget Forklifts for 2015 alongside fellow members of the Australian endurance track squad Jack Bobridge, Glenn O'Shea, Scott Sunderland and Mitchel Mulhearn, riding a domestic programme with a focus on achieving success on the track at the 2016 Summer Olympics.

References

External links
Luke Davison at cqranking

1990 births
Living people
Australian male cyclists
Cyclists at the 2014 Commonwealth Games
UCI Track Cycling World Champions (men)
Cyclists from New South Wales
Commonwealth Games gold medallists for Australia
Commonwealth Games medallists in cycling
Australian track cyclists
Medallists at the 2014 Commonwealth Games